The Old Pinellas County Courthouse is a historic county courthouse in Clearwater, Florida, USA. It was designed by Francis J. Kennard and constructed in 1918. It replaced a hastily constructed structure created to help establish Clearwater as the county seat. It is located at 315 Court Street. On June 25, 1992, it was added to the U.S. National Register of Historic Places.

References

 Pinellas County listings at National Register of Historic Places
 Florida's Office of Cultural and Historical Programs
 Pinellas County listings
 County Courthouse and Administration Building
 Pinellas County Courthouse at Florida's Historic Courthouses
 Florida's Historic Courthouses by Hampton Dunn

County courthouses in Florida
National Register of Historic Places in Pinellas County, Florida
1918 establishments in Florida
Buildings and structures in Clearwater, Florida